A podium sweep is when one team wins all available medals in a single event in a sporting event.  At the highest level, that would be when one nation wins all the medals in the Summer Olympics Athletics.  Many Olympic sports or events do not allow three entries into a single event in the Olympics, making a sweep impossible.  But in Athletics (excluding relays) the maximum for a single country is three.

In the beginning, before the Olympics became a global event, sweeps were more common amongst fewer competing countries and larger numbers of entries from a single country. After the 1908 Olympics, a sweep became an increasingly treasured status symbol of national dominance in an event.  1964 was the first Olympiad to have no sweeps.  Since then there were no sweeps in 1972, 1996 and 2000.

Sweeps have happened in every long term event in the individual program, except the 5000 metres.  It has happened eight times in the 200 metres and 110 metres hurdles, seven in the Shot Put.  A steeplechase event has had a sweep five times, by four countries.

Ray Ewry led 5 sweeps, including three from 1904, with Irving Baxter, Charles King and Joseph Stadler joining him in two each and Robert Garrett in one, plus adding a different sweep in 1900. That other sweep joined Josiah McCracken who was part of a different sweep. Ellery Clark, Robert Garrett and James Connolly swept two events together in 1896. Archie Hahn, Nate Cartmell and William Hogenson duplicated that in 1904. More recently, Carl Lewis has led three Olympic sweeps, Mike Powell has finished behind him in two. Yuriy Sedykh, Glenn Davis and Lee Calhoun have also led two sweeps, Sedykh later a participant in a third in 1988 that involved a reordering of the same three from 1980. Shelly-Ann Fraser-Pryce led the Jamaican 100m sweep in 2008 and participated in the 2020 Tokyo 100m sweep, with a silver.

Men

Women
With the majority of women's competitions happening in more modern, competitive times, sweeps have only occurred nine times.  The Pentathlon and the 100 metres are the only events to have more than one occurrence.

See also
 Olympic sweeps in speed skating
 List of medal sweeps at the World Championships in Athletics

References

Medal sweep athletics
Medal sweep athletics
Olympic medal sweeps